Kinburn may refer to:

Canada
Kinburn, Huron County, Ontario, a community in Central Huron Township
Kinburn, Carleton County, Ontario, a community in Ottawa

Ukraine
Kinburn Peninsula, a peninsula that separates Dnieper-Bug Estuary from Black Sea
Kinburn Spit, the western tip of Kinburn Peninsula
Kinburn Fortress, a historic fortress at the western tip of Kinburn Peninsula, facing Ochakiv
Battle of Kinburn (1787), Russo-Turkish War (1787–1792)
Battle of Kinburn (1855), Crimean War
 Kinburn Palanka, including Oleshky under the Crimean Khanate

Other uses
 Russian battlecruiser Kinburn, four battlecruisers ordered by the Imperial Russian Navy before World War I

See also
Battle of Kinburn (disambiguation)